is a Japanese actor, voice actor and singer affiliated with Don-crew.

Career
Early in his career, Sakamoto played Ryoma Echizen in the fourth generation Seigaku cast in Tenimyu, The Prince of Tennis musical series. In 2009, he originated the role of Ciel Phantomhive in the Black Butler musicals.

He returned to the stage play world in 2018 with the role of Horikawa Kunihiro in the Musical Touken Ranbu franchise.

Discography

Albums

Singles

Filmography

Television

Theatre
The Prince of Tennis Musical: The Progressive Match Higa Chuu feat. Rikkai (in winter of 2007-2008)
The Prince of Tennis Musical: Dream Live 5th (2008)
The Prince of Tennis Musical: The Imperial Presence Hyotei Gakuen feat. Higa Chuu (2008)
The Prince of Tennis Musical: The Treasure Match Shitenhōji feat. Hyotei Gakuen (2008–2009)
The Prince of Tennis Musical: Dream Live 6th (2009)
 Kuroshitsuji The Musical as Ciel Phantomhive (2009)
 Musical: Touken Ranbu as Horikawa Kunihiro (2018)
 The Royal Tutor: Musical II as Eugene Alexandruwitsch Romano (2019)
 xxxHolic as Kimihiro Watanuki (2021)

Films

Commercials
 Honda Informercial (2006)
 PlayStation 3 (2007)
 KDDI Company (2007)

References

External links
 Official agency profile 

1993 births
Living people
Amuse Inc. talents
Japanese male child actors
Japanese male stage actors
Japanese male television actors
Japanese male voice actors
Male voice actors from Hyōgo Prefecture
21st-century Japanese singers
21st-century Japanese male singers